Utupua is an island in the Santa Cruz Islands, located 66 km to the Southeast of the main Santa Cruz group, between Vanikoro and Santa Cruz proper (Nendo Island). This island belongs administratively to the Temotu Province of the Solomon Islands.

Geography
Utupua is a high u-shaped island surrounded by a coral reef.

Utupua has a population of 848 inhabitants (1999 census) scattered in small villages. The main villages on the island are Avita, Malombo, Tanimbili, Apakho, and Nembao. 

Utupua has a forested path that leads to viewpoints overlooking the coral reef that encloses the island.

Languages
Three Oceanic languages are spoken on Utupua:

Amba, or Nembao
Asumboa, or Asubuo
Tanimbili, or Tanibili

History
First sighting by Europeans was in September 1595 by the second Spanish expedition of Álvaro de Mendaña. More precisely it was sighted by Lorenzo Barreto while in command of one of the smaller vessels on a local voyage round the then called Santa Cruz, which is today's Nendo Island.

Notes

References

Islands of the Solomon Islands